The Rural Municipality of Strathclair is a former rural municipality (RM) in the Canadian province of Manitoba. It was originally incorporated as a rural municipality on December 22, 1883. It ceased on January 1, 2015, as a result of its provincially mandated amalgamation with the RM of Shoal Lake to form the Rural Municipality of Yellowhead.

The former RM is named for the community of Strathclair located within its boundaries. The main reserve of the Keeseekoowenin Ojibway First Nation is located within the northeast quadrant of the former RM.

Communities 
 Elphinstone
 Glenforsa
 Glossop
 Ipswich
 Menzie
 Strathclair

References 

 RM of Strathclair
 R.M. of Strathclair Community Profile
 Map of Strathclair R.M. at Statcan
 Manitoba Historical Society - Manitoba Municipalities: Rural Municipality of Strathclair

Strathclair
Populated places disestablished in 2015
2015 disestablishments in Manitoba